Fum, Fum, Fum is a traditional Catalan Christmas carol.

It is thought to have originated in the 16th or 17th century. The word "fum" means smoke in Catalan, and it may simply refer to the smoke rising from a chimney as seen from afar, or, as indicated in the New Oxford Book of Carols, "may imitate the sound of a drum (or perhaps the strumming of a guitar)". It is not typical of Spanish tradition but rather of Catalan tradition. Webster's Revised Unabridged Dictionary (1913) defines "fum" as "to play upon a fiddle," quoting Ben Jonson, "Follow me, and fum as you go."

One source, the Musical Heritage Society insert 3428 (Christmas Songs From Around the World), indicates that "fum, fum, fum" is an onomatopoeia imitating the noise of a rocking cradle, and that the rhythms come from the Sardana, a courtly dance which originated in Catalonia and the Provence.

Lyrics 
The English version is not really a translation but a version based on the traditional Catalan carol, created by Alice Parker and Robert Shaw in 1953. It was this version that popularized the carol in the United States and other English-speaking areas. There are several other versions in English as well.

See also
 List of Christmas carols

References

External links 
Scores
 
Audio
 A folk version with a Mallorcan accent by the Mallorcan band Música nostra, with an artistic video, or in another version where the video shows the musicians.
 A nice version from València by Paco Muñoz and a children's chorus
 Choral version from Barcelona by the Capella de Música de Santa Maria del Pi choral society
 English version by the Jubilate Ensemble, at Christ United Methodist Church, College Station, Texas

Text

 "El vint-i-cinc de desembre"

Christmas carols
Year of song unknown
Catalan music